Ficus neriifolia is a species of fig (Ficus). It is native to Asia, including Bhutan, Burma, China, India, and Nepal.

Description
Ficus neriifolia grows as a tree up to 15 m (50 ft) tall with smooth, dark grey bark on its trunk. The  diameter figs are rounded, oval, or cylindrical and grow in pairs off older branches.

Taxonomy
James Edward Smith described Ficus neriifolia in 1810.

In 1965, E.H.Corner regarded the species as having three valid varieties : F. neriifolia var. nemoralis, F. neriifolia var. fieldingii and F. neriifolia var. trilepis. However, Wu and colleagues did not treat them as distinct in 2003.  Chaudhary and colleagues observed that the receptacles are distinct and hence further investigation is needed.

Distribution and habitat
Ficus neriifolia is found in Mêdog County in southern Tibet and western Yunnan province in China, as well as Bhutan, Myanmar, central and western Nepal, northeastern India including Sikkim, Arunachal Pradesh, Assam, Meghalaya, Mizoram, Nagaland and Uttar Pradesh.

Ecology
The figs and leaves are eaten by the endangered black crested gibbon (Nomascus concolor) in Yunnan province, particularly between May and September where it is the most commonly eaten plant species. It is also an important food item of the eastern hoolock gibbon (Hoolock leuconedys)

Uses

The foliage of Ficus neriifolia is used as fodder and its wood used as fuel in Nepal. The juice of the stem bark is used as a folk remedy for conjunctivitis and boils This fig tree is considered good for indoor bonsai in temperate climates, and it is easily shaped and pruned.

References

neriifolia
Flora of the Indian subcontinent
Trees of Myanmar
Trees of China
Plants used in bonsai
Plants described in 1810